Albuquerque, abbreviated ABQ, is the most populous city in the U.S. state of New Mexico. Its nicknames, The Duke City and Burque, both reference its founding in 1706 as La Villa de Alburquerque by Nuevo México governor Francisco Cuervo y Valdés. Named in honor of the Viceroy of New Spain, the 10th Duke of Alburquerque, the city was an outpost on El Camino Real linking Mexico City to the northernmost territories of New Spain. In 2006 the city celebrated its 300th anniversary. 

Located in the Albuquerque Basin, the city is flanked by the Sandia Mountains to the east and the West Mesa to the west, with the Rio Grande and bosque flowing north-to-south through the middle of the city. According to the 2020 census, Albuquerque had 564,559 residents, making it the 32nd-most populous city in the United States and the fourth largest in the Southwest. The Albuquerque metropolitan area had 916,528 residents in 2020, and forms part of the Albuquerque–Santa Fe–Las Vegas combined statistical area, which had a population of 1,162,523. 

Albuquerque is a hub for technology and media companies, historic landmarks,  and the fine arts. The city is home to the University of New Mexico, the Albuquerque International Balloon Fiesta, the Gathering of Nations, the New Mexico State Fair, and a diverse restaurant scene, which features both New Mexican and global cuisine.

History

Petroglyphs carved into basalt in the western part of the city bear testimony to an early Native American presence in the area, now preserved in the Petroglyph National Monument.

The Tanoan and Keresan peoples had lived along the Rio Grande for centuries before European settlers arrived in what is now Albuquerque. By the 1500s, there were around 20 Tiwa pueblos along a  stretch of river from present-day Algodones to the Rio Puerco confluence south of Belen. Of these, 12 or 13 were densely clustered near present-day Bernalillo and the remainder were spread out to the south.

Two Tiwa pueblos lie specifically on the outskirts of the present-day city, both of which have been continuously inhabited for many centuries: Sandia Pueblo, which was founded in the 14th century, and the Pueblo of Isleta, for which written records go back to the early 17th century, when it was chosen as the site of the San Agustín de la Isleta Mission, a Catholic mission.

The Navajo, Apache, and Comanche peoples were also likely to have set camps in the Albuquerque area, as there is evidence of trade and cultural exchange among the different Native American groups going back centuries before European arrival.

Albuquerque was founded in 1706 as an outpost as La Villa de Alburquerque by Francisco Cuervo y Valdés in the provincial kingdom of Santa Fe de Nuevo México and named after the Viceroy Francisco Fernández de la Cueva, 10th duke of Alburquerque, which is from a town in Spain. Albuquerque was a farming and shepherding community and strategically located trading and military outpost along the Camino Real, for the other already established for the Tiquex and Hispano towns in the area, such as Barelas, Corrales, Isleta Pueblo, Los Ranchos, and Sandia Pueblo.

After 1821, Mexico also had a military presence there. The town of Alburquerque was built in the traditional Spanish villa pattern: a central plaza surrounded by government buildings, homes, and a church. This central plaza area has been preserved and is open to the public as a cultural area and center of commerce. It is referred to as "Old Town Albuquerque" or simply "Old Town". Historically it was sometimes referred to as "La Placita" (Little Plaza in Spanish). On the north side of Old Town Plaza is San Felipe de Neri Church. Built in 1793, it is one of the oldest surviving buildings in the city.

After the New Mexico Territory became a part of the United States, Albuquerque had a federal garrison and quartermaster depot, the Post of Albuquerque, from 1846 to 1867. In Beyond the Mississippi (1867), Albert D. Richardson, traveling to California via coach, passed through Albuquerque in late October 1859—its population was 3,000 at the time—and described it as "one of the richest and pleasantest towns, with a Spanish cathedral and other buildings more than two hundred years old."

During the Civil War, Albuquerque was occupied for a month in February 1862 by Confederate troops under General Henry Hopkins Sibley, who soon afterwards advanced with his main body into northern New Mexico. During his retreat from Union troops into Texas, he made a stand on April 8, 1862 at Albuquerque and fought the Battle of Albuquerque against a detachment of Union soldiers commanded by Colonel Edward R. S. Canby. This daylong engagement at long range led to few casualties, as the citizens of Albuquerque aided the Republican Union to rid the city of the occupying Confederate troops.

When the Atchison, Topeka and Santa Fe Railroad arrived in 1880, it bypassed the Plaza, locating the passenger depot and railyards about 2 miles (3 km) east in what quickly became known as New Albuquerque or New Town. The railway company built a hospital for its workers that was later a juvenile psychiatric facility and has now been converted to a hotel. Many Anglo merchants, mountain men, and settlers slowly filtered into Albuquerque, creating a major mercantile commercial center which is now Downtown Albuquerque. From this commercial center on July 4, 1882, Park Van Tassel became the first to fly a balloon in Albuquerque with a landing at Old Town. This was also the first flight in the New Mexico Territory. Due to a rising rate of violent crime, gunman Milt Yarberry was appointed the town's first marshal that year. New Albuquerque was incorporated as a town in 1885, with Henry N. Jaffa its first mayor. It was incorporated as a city in 1891. Old Town remained a separate community until the 1920s when it was absorbed by Albuquerque. Old Albuquerque High School, the city's first public high school, was established in 1879. Congregation Albert, a Reform synagogue established in 1897, is the oldest continuing Jewish organization in the city.

By 1900, Albuquerque boasted a population of 8,000 inhabitants and all the modern amenities, including an electric street railway connecting Old Town, New Town, and the recently established University of New Mexico campus on the East Mesa. In 1902, the famous Alvarado Hotel was built adjacent to the new passenger depot, and it remained a symbol of the city until it was razed in 1970 to make room for a parking lot. In 2002, the Alvarado Transportation Center was built on the site in a manner resembling the old landmark. The large metro station functions as the downtown headquarters for the city's transit department. It also serves as an intermodal hub for local buses, Greyhound buses, Amtrak passenger trains, and the Rail Runner commuter rail line.

New Mexico's dry climate brought many tuberculosis patients to the city in search of a cure during the early 20th century, and several sanitaria sprang up on the West Mesa to serve them. Presbyterian Hospital and St. Joseph Hospital, two of the largest hospitals in the Southwest, had their beginnings during this period. Influential New Deal–era governor Clyde Tingley and famed Southwestern architect John Gaw Meem were among those brought to New Mexico by tuberculosis.

The first travelers on Route 66 appeared in Albuquerque in 1926, and before long, dozens of motels, restaurants, and gift shops had sprung up along the roadside to serve them. Route 66 originally ran through the city on a north–south alignment along Fourth Street, but in 1937 it was realigned along Central Avenue, a more direct east–west route. The intersection of Fourth and Central downtown was the principal crossroads of the city for decades. The majority of the surviving structures from the Route 66 era are on Central, though there are also some on Fourth. Signs between Bernalillo and Los Lunas along the old route now have brown, historical highway markers denoting it as Pre-1937 Route 66.

The establishment of Kirtland Air Force Base in 1939, Sandia Base in the early 1940s, and Sandia National Laboratories in 1949, would make Albuquerque a key player of the Atomic Age. Meanwhile, the city continued to expand outward into the Northeast Heights, reaching a population of 201,189 by 1960. In 1990, it was 384,736 and in 2007 it was 518,271. In June 2007, Albuquerque was listed as the sixth fastest-growing city in the United States. In 1990, the U.S. Census Bureau reported Albuquerque's population as 34.5% Hispanic and 58.3% non-Hispanic white.

On April 11, 1950, a USAF B-29 bomber carrying a nuclear weapon crashed into a mountain near Manzano Base. On May 22, 1957, a B-36 accidentally dropped a Mark 17 nuclear bomb 4.5 miles from the control tower while landing at Kirtland Air Force Base. Only the conventional trigger detonated, the bomb being unarmed. These incidents were classified for decades.

Albuquerque's downtown entered the same phase and development (decline, "urban renewal" with continued decline, and gentrification) as nearly every city across the United States. As Albuquerque spread outward, the downtown area fell into a decline. Many historic buildings were razed in the 1960s and 1970s to make way for new plazas, high-rises, and parking lots as part of the city's urban renewal phase. , only recently has Downtown Albuquerque come to regain much of its urban character, mainly through the construction of many new loft apartment buildings and the renovation of historic structures such as the KiMo Theater, in the gentrification phase.

During the 21st century, Albuquerque's population has continued to grow rapidly. The population of the city proper was estimated at 528,497 in 2009, up from 448,607 in the 2000 census. During 2005 and 2006, the city celebrated its tricentennial with a diverse program of cultural events.

The passage of the Planned Growth Strategy in 2002–2004 was the community's strongest effort to create a framework for a more balanced and sustainable approach to urban growth.

Urban sprawl is limited on three sides—by the Sandia Pueblo to the north, the Isleta Pueblo and Kirtland Air Force Base to the south, and the Sandia Mountains to the east. Suburban growth continues at a strong pace to the west, beyond the Petroglyph National Monument, once thought to be a natural boundary to sprawl development.

Because of less-costly land and lower taxes, much of the growth in the metropolitan area is taking place outside of the city of Albuquerque itself. In Rio Rancho to the northwest, the communities east of the mountains, and the incorporated parts of Valencia County, population growth rates approach twice that of Albuquerque. The primary cities in Valencia County are Los Lunas and Belen, both of which are home to growing industrial complexes and new residential subdivisions. The mountain towns of Tijeras, Edgewood, and Moriarty, while close enough to Albuquerque to be considered suburbs, have experienced much less growth compared to Rio Rancho, Bernalillo, Los Lunas, and Belen. Limited water supply and rugged terrain are the main limiting factors for development in these towns. The Mid Region Council of Governments (MRCOG), which includes constituents from throughout the Albuquerque area, was formed to ensure that these governments along the middle Rio Grande would be able to meet the needs of their rapidly rising populations. MRCOG's cornerstone project is currently the New Mexico Rail Runner Express. In October 2013, the Albuquerque Journal reported Albuquerque as the third best city to own an investment property.

Geography

Located in north-central New Mexico, Albuquerque serves as the county seat of Bernalillo County. To its east are the Sandia–Manzano Mountains. The Rio Grande flows north to south through its center, while the West Mesa and Petroglyph National Monument make up the western part of the city.

Albuquerque lies within a fertile valley on the Rio Grande River with its Bosque forest, in the center of the Albuquerque Basin, flanked on the eastern side by the Sandia Mountains and to the west by the West Mesa. Located in central New Mexico, the city also has noticeable influences from the adjacent Colorado Plateau semi-desert, New Mexico Mountains forested with juniper and pine, and Southwest plateaus and plains steppe ecoregions, depending on where one is located.

Landforms and drainage
Albuquerque has one of the highest elevations of any major city in the United States, though the effects of this are greatly tempered by its southwesterly continental position. The elevation of the city ranges from 4,900 feet (1,490 m) above sea level near the Rio Grande (in the Valley) to over 6,700 feet (1,950 m) in the foothill areas of Sandia Heights and Glenwood Hills. At the Albuquerque International Airport, the elevation is 5,352 feet (1,631 m) above sea level.

The Rio Grande is classified, like the Nile, as an "exotic" river. The New Mexico portion of the Rio Grande lies within the Rio Grande Rift Valley, bordered by a system of faults, including those that lifted up the adjacent Sandia and Manzano Mountains, while lowering the area where the life-sustaining Rio Grande now flows.

Geology and ecology

Albuquerque lies in the Albuquerque Basin, a portion of the Rio Grande rift.
The Sandia Mountains are the predominant geographic feature visible in Albuquerque. Sandía is Spanish for "watermelon", and is popularly believed to be a reference to the brilliant pink and green coloration of the mountains at sunset. The pink is due to large exposures of granodiorite cliffs, and the green is due to large swaths of conifer forests. However, Robert Julyan notes in The Place Names of New Mexico, "the most likely explanation is the one believed by the Sandia Pueblo Indians: the Spaniards, when they encountered the Pueblo in 1540, called it Sandia, because they thought the squash growing there were watermelons, and the name Sandia soon was transferred to the mountains east of the pueblo." He also notes that the Sandia Pueblo Indians call the mountain Bien Mur, "big mountain."

The Sandia foothills, on the west side of the mountains, have soils derived from that same rock material with varying sizes of decomposed granite, mixed with areas of clay and caliche (a calcium carbonate deposit common in the arid southwestern USA), along with some exposed granite bedrock.

Below the foothills, the area usually called the "Northeast Heights" consists of a mix of clay and caliche soils, overlaying a layer of decomposed granite, resulting from long-term outwash of that material from the adjacent mountains. This bajada is quite noticeable when driving into Albuquerque from the north or south, due to its fairly uniform slope from the mountains' edge downhill to the valley. Sand hills are scattered along the I-25 corridor and directly above the Rio Grande Valley, forming the lower end of the Heights.

The Rio Grande Valley, due to long-term shifting of the actual river channel, contains layers and areas of soils varying between caliche, clay, loam, and even some sand.

The last significant area of Albuquerque geologically is the West Mesa: this is the elevated land west of the Rio Grande, including "West Bluff", the sandy terrace immediately west and above the river, and the rather sharply defined volcanic escarpment above and west of most of the developed city. The west mesa commonly has soils often referred to as "blow sand", along with occasional clay and caliche and even basalt, nearing the escarpment.

Scrub and mesa vegetation such as sagebrush (Artemisia filifolia), fourwing saltbush (Atriplex canescens), Indian ricegrass (Oryzopsis hymenoides), sand dropseed (Sporobolus cryptandrus), and mesa dropseed (Sporobolus flexuosus) is often found in sandy soils. Arroyos contain desert willow (Chilopsis linearis) while breaks and the prominent volcanic escarpment include threeleaf sumac with less frequent stands of oneseed juniper (Juniperus monosperma), netleaf hackberry (Celtis reticulata), mariola (Parthenium incanum), and beebrush or oreganillo (Aloysia wrightii). Isolated littleleaf sumac (Rhus microphylla) occurs on the hillsides above Taylor Ranch and at the Petroglyph National Monument Visitor's Center.

In the bosque are the eponymous Rio Grande cottonwood (Populus deltoides var. wislizeni), coyote willow (Salix exigua), mesquite or tornillo (Prosopis pubescens), Gooding's willow (Salix goodingii), and saint sacaton (Sporobulus wrightii). Other trees native to the bosque include, New Mexico olive (Forestiera pubescens var. neomexicana), New Mexico walnut (Juglans major), and New Mexico ash (Fraxinus velutina). Non-native plants such as Siberian elm, Russian olive, saltcedar, mulberries, Ailanthus, and ravenna grass also exist in large quantities.

The mountainous parts of the city feature piñon pine, desert live oak (Quercus turbinella), gray oak (Quercus grisea), hairy mountain mahogany (Cercocarpus breviflorus), oneseed juniper (Juniperus monosperma), piñon (Pinus edulis), threeleaf sumac (Rhus trilobata), Engelmann prickly pear (Opuntia engelmannii), juniper prickly pear (Opuntia hystricina var. juniperiana), and beargrass (Nolina greenei, formerly considered Nolina texana).

Native birds such as the greater roadrunner thrive in the city. Other birds include the common raven, American crow, great-tailed grackle, Gambel's and scaled quail, several species of hummingbirds, house finch, robin, pigeon, mourning dove, white wing and European collared doves (both recent appearances), curve-billed thrasher, pinyon jay, and Cooper's, Swainson's, and red-tail hawks. The valley hosts sandhill cranes each winter.

Other fauna include reptilia and amphibia such as the southwestern fence lizard and New Mexico whiptail (Aspidoscelis neomexicanus), rattlesnake, the New Mexico garter snake, the bullsnake, Woodhouse toads, New Mexico spadefoot toads, and tadpole shrimp ("Triops"). As well as arthropods like the plains cicada, vinegaroon, desert centipede, white-lined sphynx (hummingbird moth), two-tailed swallowtail, fig beetle, New Mexico mantis, and harvester ant.

Cityscape

Quadrants
Albuquerque is geographically divided into four quadrants that are officially part of mailing addresses. They are NE (northeast), NW (northwest), SE (southeast), and SW (southwest). The north–south dividing line is Central Avenue (the path that Route 66 took through the city), and the east–west dividing line is the Rail Runner tracks.

Northeast

This quadrant has been experiencing a housing expansion since the late 1950s. It abuts the base of the Sandia Mountains and contains portions of the foothills neighborhoods, which are significantly higher, in elevation and price range, than the rest of the city. Running from Central Avenue and the railroad tracks to the Sandia Peak Aerial Tram, this is the largest quadrant both geographically and by population. Martineztown, the University of New Mexico, the Maxwell Museum of Anthropology, Nob Hill, the Uptown area which includes three shopping malls (Coronado Center, ABQ Uptown, and Winrock Town Center), Hoffmantown, Journal Center, Cliff's Amusement Park, and Balloon Fiesta Park are all in this quadrant.

Some of the most affluent neighborhoods in the city are here, including: High Desert, Tanoan, Sandia Heights, and North Albuquerque Acres. Parts of Sandia Heights and North Albuquerque Acres are outside the city limits proper. A few houses in the farthest reach of this quadrant lie in the Cibola National Forest, just over the line into Sandoval County.

Northwest

This quadrant contains historic Old Town Albuquerque, which dates to the 18th century, as well as the Indian Pueblo Cultural Center. The area has a mixture of commercial districts and low to high-income neighborhoods. Northwest Albuquerque includes the largest section of Downtown, Rio Grande Nature Center State Park and the Bosque ("woodlands"), Petroglyph National Monument, Double Eagle II Airport, the Paradise Hills neighborhood, Taylor Ranch, and Cottonwood Mall.

This quadrant also contains the North Valley settlement, outside the city limits, which has some expensive homes and small ranches along the Rio Grande. The city of Albuquerque engulfs the village of Los Ranchos de Albuquerque. A small portion of the rapidly developing area on the west side of the river south of the Petroglyphs, known as the "West Mesa" or "Westside", consisting primarily of traditional residential subdivisions, also extends into this quadrant. The city proper is bordered on the north by the North Valley, the village of Corrales, and the city of Rio Rancho.

Southeast

Kirtland Air Force Base, Sandia National Laboratories, Sandia Science & Technology Park, the Max Q commercial district, Albuquerque International Sunport, American Society of Radiologic Technologists, Central New Mexico Community College, UNM South Campus, Duke City BMX, University Stadium, Rio Grande Credit Union Field at Isotopes Park, The Pit, Mesa del Sol, Isleta Amphitheater, Netflix Studios, Isleta Resort & Casino, the National Museum of Nuclear Science & History, New Mexico Veterans Memorial, and Talin Market are all located in the Southeast quadrant of Albuquerque.  

The southern half of the International District lies along Central Ave and Louisiana Blvd. Here, many immigrant communities have settled and thrive, having established numerous businesses. Albuquerque’s Vietnamese American community is partly business-centered in this area, as well as the Eubank, Juan Tabo, and Central areas, and other parts of Albuquerque.  

The Four Hills neighborhoods are located in and around the foothills on the outskirts of Southeast Albuquerque. The vast newer subdivision of Volterra lies west of the Four Hills area. Popular urban neighborhoods that can be found in Southeast Albuquerque include Nob Hill, Ridgecrest, Parkland Hills, Hyder Park, and University Heights.

Southwest
Traditionally consisting of agricultural and rural areas and suburban neighborhoods, the Southwest quadrant comprises the south-end of Downtown Albuquerque, the Barelas neighborhood, the rapidly growing west side, and the community of South Valley, New Mexico, often called "The South Valley". The quadrant extends all the way to the Isleta Indian Reservation. Newer suburban subdivisions on the West Mesa near the southwestern city limits join homes of older construction, some dating as far back as the 1940s. This quadrant includes the old communities of Atrisco, Los Padillas, Huning Castle, Kinney, Westgate, Westside, Alamosa, Mountainview, and Pajarito. The Bosque ("woodlands"), the National Hispanic Cultural Center, the Rio Grande Zoo, and Tingley Beach are also here.

A new adopted development plan, the Santolina Master Plan, will extend development on the west side past 118th Street SW to the edge of the Rio Puerco Valley and house 100,000 by 2050.

Climate
Albuquerque's climate is classified as a cold semi-arid climate (BSk) according to one application of the Köppen climate classification system. Its climate is classified as semi-desert warm temperate as defined by The Biota of North America Program and the U.S. Geological Survey's Terrestrial Ecosystems—Isobioclimates of the Conterminous United States, using datasets and mapping technology such as those from the PRISM Climate Group.

Albuquerque is located at the crossroads of several ecoregions, depending on the system applied. According to the U.S. Environmental Protection Agency, the city is located in the southeastern edge of the Arizona/New Mexico Plateau, with the Arizona/New Mexico Mountains ecoregion defining the adjacent Sandia-Manzano mountains, including the foothills in the eastern edges of the city proper east of about Juan Tabo Boulevard. Though the city lies at the northern edge of the Chihuahuan Desert transitioning into the Colorado Plateau, much of Albuquerque area west of the Sandia Mountains shares a similar aridity, temperature regime, and natural vegetation more with that of the Chihuahuan Desert, namely the desert grassland and sand scrub plant communities.

The eastern areas of the Greater Albuquerque Area, known as the East Mountain Area, lie the Southwestern Tablelands, sometimes considered a southern extension of the central high plains and northeast New Mexico highlands. To the north is the Southern Rockies ecoregion in the Jemez Mountains.

The average annual precipitation is less than half of evaporation supporting an arid climate, and no month's daily temperature mean is below freezing. The climate is rather mild compared to parts of the country further north or further south. However, due to the city's high elevation, low temperatures in winter often dip below freezing. Varied terrain and elevations within the city and outlying areas cause daily temperature differentials to vary.

Albuquerque's climate is usually sunny and dry, with an average of 3,415 sunshine hours per year. Brilliant sunshine defines the region, averaging 278 days a year; periods of variably mid and high-level cloudiness temper the sun, mostly during the cooler months. Extended cloudiness lasting longer than two or three days is rare.

Winter typically consists of cool days and cold nights, except following passage of the strongest cold fronts and arctic airmasses when daytime temperatures remain colder than average; overnight temperatures tend to fall below freezing between about 10 pm and 8 am in the city, except during colder airmasses, plus colder spots of the valley and most of the East Mountain areas. It is typical for daily low temperatures in much of late December, and January, and February to be below freezing, with a long-term average of 93 days per year falling to or below freezing, and two days failing to rise above freezing. In March, winds dominate as the temperatures began to warm late in the winter.

Spring is windy, sometimes unsettled with rain, though spring is usually the driest part of the year in Albuquerque. In May, the winds tend to subside as a summer-like airmass and temperatures begin to occur into with regularity. The warming and drying trend continues into June. By mid-June, temperatures can exceed .

Summer is lengthy and very warm to hot, relatively tolerable for most people because of low humidity and air movement. Despite the rarity of such heat, 28 days with highs at or above  occurred in the summer of 1980 at Albuquerque's Sunport. In September, the monsoon begins to weaken.

Autumn is generally cool in the mornings and nights but sees less rain than summer, though the weather can be more unsettled closer to winter, as colder airmasses and weather patterns build in from the north and northwest with more frequency. Occasionally, snow will fall in late autumn in December; rarely in late November.

On average, January is the driest month, while July and August are the wettest months, as a result of shower and thunderstorm activity produced by the monsoon prevalent over the Southwestern United States. Most rain occurs during the late summer monsoon season, typically starting in early June and ending in mid-September.

Albuquerque averages  of snow per winter, and experiences several accumulating snow events each season. Locations in the Northeast Heights and Eastern Foothills tend to receive more snowfall due to each region's higher elevation and proximity to the mountains. More recently, a major winter storm in late February 2015 dropped up to a foot (30 cm) of snow on most of the city. Such large snowfalls are rare occurrences during the period of record, and they greatly impact traffic movement and the workforce due to their rarity.

The mountains and highlands east of the city create a rain shadow effect, due to the drying of air descending the mountains; the Sandia Mountain foothills tend to lift any available moisture, enhancing precipitation to about  annually. Traveling west, north, and east of Albuquerque, one quickly rises in elevation and leaves the sheltering effect of the valley to enter a noticeably cooler and slightly wetter environment. One such area is considered part of Albuquerque Metropolitan Area, commonly called the East Mountain area; it is covered in woodlands of juniper and piñon trees, a common trait of southwestern uplands and the southernmost Rocky Mountains.

Hydrology
Albuquerque's drinking water comes from a combination of Rio Grande water (river water diverted from the Colorado River basin through the San Juan-Chama Project) and a delicate aquifer that has been described as an "underground Lake Superior". The Albuquerque Bernalillo County Water Utility Authority (ABCWUA) has developed a water resources management strategy that pursues conservation and the direct extraction of water from the Rio Grande for the development of a stable underground aquifer in the future.

The aquifer of the Rio Puerco is too saline to be cost-effectively used for drinking. Much of the rainwater Albuquerque receives does not recharge its aquifer. It is diverted through a network of paved channels and arroyos and empties into the Rio Grande.

The water is delivered to the Rio Grande by the San Juan–Chama Project. The project's construction was initiated by legislation signed by President John F. Kennedy in 1962, and was completed in 1971. This diversion project transports water under the continental divide from Navajo Lake to Lake Heron on the Rio Chama, a tributary of the Rio Grande. In the past much of this water was resold to downstream owners in Texas. These arrangements ended in 2008 with the completion of the ABCWUA's Drinking Water Supply Project.

The ABCWUA's Drinking Water Supply Project uses a system of adjustable-height dams to skim water from the Rio Grande into sluices that lead to water treatment facilities for direct conversion to potable water. Some water is allowed to flow through central Albuquerque, mostly to protect the endangered Rio Grande Silvery Minnow. Treated effluent water is recycled into the Rio Grande south of the city. The ABCWUA expects river water to comprise up to seventy percent of its water budget in 2060. Groundwater will constitute the remainder. One of the policies of the ABCWUA's strategy is the acquisition of additional river water.

Demographics

According to the 2020 U.S. Census, there were 564,559 people and 229,701 households in Albuquerque. The population density was 2,907.6 per square mile (4679.329/km), making Albuquerque one of the least densely populated large cities in the U.S.

In 2020, the racial makeup of the city was 60.3% White (including some residents of Hispano or Mexican heritage), 4.5% Native American, 3.1% Black or African American, 3% Asian, 0.1% Native Hawaiian and other Pacific Islander, and 9.2% Multiracial (two or more races). About half of all residents (49.2%) were Hispanic or Latino, of any race, while non-Hispanic whites accounted for 38.3%. 

In 2010, about one-third of Albuquerque households (33.3%) had children under the age of 18, 43.6% were married couples living together, 12.9% had a female with no husband present, and 38.5% were non-families; 30.5% of all households were made up of individuals, and 8.4% had someone living alone who was 65 years of age or older. The average household size was 2.40 and the average family size was 3.02.

In 2010, the age distribution was 24.5% under 18, 10.6% from 18 to 24, 30.9% from 25 to 44, 21.9% from 45 to 64, and 12.0% who were 65 or older. The median age was 35 years. For every 100 females, there were 94.4 males. For every 100 females age 18 and over, there were 91.8 males.

In 2010, the median income for a household in the city was $38,272, and the median income for a family was $46,979. Males had a median income of $34,208 versus $26,397 for females. The per capita income for the city was $20,884. About 10.0% of families and 13.5% of the population were below the poverty line, including 17.4% of those under age 18 and 8.5% of those age 65 or over.

The Albuquerque metropolitan area had 923,630 residents in July 2020. The area includes Rio Rancho, Bernalillo, Placitas, Zia Pueblo, Los Lunas, Belen, South Valley, Bosque Farms, Jemez Pueblo, Cuba, and part of Laguna Pueblo. This metro is part of the larger Albuquerque–Santa Fe–Las Vegas combined statistical area (CSA), with a population of 1,171,991 as of 2016. The CSA constitutes the southernmost point of the Southern Rocky Mountain Front megalopolis, with a population of 5,467,633 according to the 2010 United States Census, including other major Rocky Mountain region cities such as Cheyenne, Wyoming; Denver, Colorado; and Colorado Springs, Colorado.

Religion 
The majority of Albuquerque residents are Christian. Reflecting its long history as a Spanish city, the Catholic Church is the largest denomination; Catholics are served by the Roman Catholic Archdiocese of Santa Fe, whose administrative center is located in Albuquerque. Collectively, other Christian churches and organizations, such as the Eastern Orthodox Church and Oriental Orthodoxy, among others, make up the second largest group. Baptists form the third largest Christian group, followed by Latter Day Saints, Pentecostals, Methodists, Presbyterians, Lutherans and Episcopalians.

Judaism is the second-largest non-Christian religion in Albuquerque; Congregation Albert, a Reform synagogue established in 1897, is the oldest extant Jewish organization in New Mexico. Islam is the next largest minority religion, with an estimated 3,000 to 5,000 adherents, representing 85% of the state's Muslim population. The Islamic Center of New Mexico is the largest mosque in Albuquerque, hosting daily prayers and activities for both Muslims and non-Muslims.

If counted together, the largest religious group consists of eastern religions such as Buddhism, Sikhism, and Hinduism. The Albuquerque Sikh Gurudwara and Guru Nanak Gurdwara Albuquerque serve the city's Sikh population, while the main Hindu organizations are the Hindu Temple Society of New Mexico and Gayatri Temple. There are several Buddhist temples and centers throughout the city, representing different movements and schools, such as Zen and Soka Gakki.

Homelessness

Like many major American cities, Albuquerque struggles with homelessness, which has become more visible since the 2000s. According to Rock at Noon Day, a homeless services center, there were an estimated 4,000 to 4,500 homeless living in the Albuquerque metropolitan area in 2019, with millennials and elderly accounting for the fastest growing segments. Albuquerque Public Schools spokeswoman Monica Armenta said the number of homeless kids enrolled in district schools (meaning children from families that have no permanent address) has consistently ranged from 3,200 to 3,500. The Coordinated Entry System, a centralized citywide system used to track and fill supportive housing openings when they become available, shows that about 5,000 households experienced homelessness in 2018. Homelessness is particularly concentrated in the International District off Central Avenue, which suffers from chronic blight and drug use, and around Downtown.

Arts and culture

Albuquerque hosts the International Balloon Fiesta, the world's largest gathering of hot-air balloons, taking place every October at Balloon Fiesta Park, with its 47-acre launch field. Another large venue is Expo New Mexico, where other annual events are held, such as North America's largest pow wow at the Gathering of Nations, as well as the New Mexico State Fair. Other major venues throughout the metropolitan area include the National Hispanic Cultural Center, the University of New Mexico's Popejoy Hall, Santa Ana Star Center, and Isleta Amphitheater. Old Town Albuquerque's Plaza, Hotel, and San Felipe de Neri Church hosts traditional fiestas and events such as weddings, also near Old Town are the New Mexico Museum of Natural History and Science, Albuquerque Museum of Art and History, Indian Pueblo Cultural Center, Explora, and Albuquerque Biological Park. Located in Downtown Albuquerque are historic theaters such as the KiMo Theater, and near the Civic Plaza is the Al Hurricane Pavilion and Albuquerque Convention Center with its Kiva Auditorium. Due to its population size, the metropolitan area regularly receives most national and international music concerts, Broadway shows, and other large traveling events, as well as New Mexico music, and other local music performances.

Sandia Peak Ski Area, adjacent to Albuquerque, provides both winter and summer recreation in the Sandia Mountains. It features Sandia Peak Tramway, the world's second-longest passenger aerial tramway, and the longest in the Americas. It stretches from the northeast edge of the city to Sandia Peak, the summit of the ski resort, and has the world's third-longest single span. A fine-dining restaurant, TEN 3 (stylized as 10|3), is located at the top.

Media and entertainment

Albuquerque is a hub for production studios, including Albuquerque Studios, which is one of the primary productions hubs for Netflix. Several major motion pictures and television shows have been filmed and produced in Albuquerque, including scenes from Walt Disney Presents Elfego Baca, The Muppet Movie, the Breaking Bad franchise, The Avengers, A Million Ways to Die in the West, In Plain Sight, Speechless, Daybreak, Just Getting Started, and Stranger Things season 4. NBCUniversal also has a sizable presence in the city, as do independent multimedia franchise studios including Blackout Theatre, Cliffdweller Studios, and Heaven Sent Gaming.

Numerous works of fiction take place, either fully or in part, in the Albuquerque metropolitan area including Albuquerque (1948 Western), Bless Me, Ultima, The Good, the Bad, and the Ugly, Breaking Bad (along with its spin-offs Better Call Saul and El Camino), and High School Musical. The city is referenced in Billy Mize's 1967 album Lights of Albuquerque, Jim Glaser's 1986 song "The Lights of Albuquerque", Neil Young's song "Albuquerque", and "Weird" Al Yankovic's song "Albuquerque". The city is referenced in "Hungry, Hungry Homer", the 15th episode of the twelfth season of The Simpsons, which features Albuquerque as the location where the owners of the Springfield Isotopes baseball team wish to relocate; the episode inspired the name of the real Albuquerque Isotopes Minor League team. Many Bugs Bunny cartoon shorts feature Bugs traveling around the world by burrowing underground. Ending up in the wrong place, Bugs consults a map, complaining, "I knew I should have taken that left toin at Albakoykee (left turn at Albuquerque)." Failure to do so can somehow result in Bugs ending up thousands of miles off-course. (Bugs first uses that line in 1945's Herr Meets Hare.)

The city is served by one major newspaper, the Albuquerque Journal, other ongoing periodicals in the city include Albuquerque the Magazine, both of which are distributed throughout the Southwestern United States and are catalogued by the Library of Congress. The Journal is New Mexico's most widely circulated newspaper, and used to compete with The Albuquerque Tribune until 2008; today The Journal competes with The Santa Fe New Mexican and Las Cruces Sun-News. The Albuquerque metropolitan area itself has other local periodicals, Valencia County News-Bulletin, Rio Rancho Observer, Corrales Comment, and the student newspapers of The Lobo at University of New Mexico and CNM Chronicle at Central New Mexico Community College.

Albuquerque is also home to numerous radio and television stations that serve the metropolitan and outlying rural areas. Albuquerque is home to eighteen broadcast television stations, including KOB, KRQE, KOAT-TV, and KLUZ-TV, although most households are served by direct cable network connections. Comcast Cable nearly has a monopoly on terrestrial cable service in the city, but not throughout the entire Albuquerque-Santa Fe media market, which is ranked as the 48th largest television market in the United States, Comcast shares the metropolitan market with Cable One, Unite Private Networks, and various satellite and wireless providers.

Christian media outlets in the city include Trinity Broadcasting Network which owns the KNAT-TV signal, and independent Christian broadcasting exists on KAZQ. Each of the Albuquerque metropolitan area's megachurches have media presence with broadcasts of their sermons, those include Legacy, Calvary, and Sagebrush. Christian radio is found on FM and AM through KLYT, KSVA, KDAZ, KFLQ, and KKIM.

Radio and music
One of the longest running AM broadcasts in the United States is an ABC News Radio station called KKOB (AM). The first officially licensed FM radio broadcast in Albuquerque was KANW which mostly broadcasts the New Mexico music genre and NPR programming.

The Sanchez family, including brothers Al Hurricane, Tiny Morrie, Baby Gaby, and their children Al Hurricane Jr, Lorenzo Antonio, and Sparx, were known for popularizing New Mexico's Hispano and Native American folk genre by blending it with rockabilly, jazz, Western, Norteño, Latin pop, and rock music. The brothers and junior first became popular performing in the city, and garnered international prominence by performing on the syndicated late-night talk show the Val De La O Show. The show was filmed in Albuquerque, which also featured country music and regional Mexican stars from the broader Southwestern United States and Mexico. Al Hurricane has such a large legacy that then mayor Richard J. Berry named the center stage of Albuquerque Plaza the "Al Hurricane Pavilion". Regional folk and country music continues to be a popular in the city. With the aforementioned New Mexico music genre specific KANW, as well as KNMM on Saturdays, country radio stations KRST "92.1" and KBQI "The Big-I 107.9", along with KBQI's classic country "98.1 The Bull", and Regional Mexican radio on KLVO "Radio Lobo 97.7".

Other forms of American popular music are very represented on FM radio: contemporary hit radio is featured on KOBQ. During the 1990s, the urban contemporary music radio format had two major stations, on "KISS 97.3" KKSS and "WILD 106" KDLW. Today, KISS 97.3 still exists, though WILD has changed to a variety of formats. In the 2000s modern rock stations focusing on alternative rock, nu metal, and adult contemporary music became popular in the city, including the FM station KPEK "100.3 The Peak". During this time, contemporary Christian music garnered success with KLYT, branded as M88 in its earlier days, due to the crossover of Christian rock and Christian hip hop with popular music.

Music groups based in Albuquerque include A Hawk and A Hacksaw, Beirut, The Echoing Green, The Eyeliners, Hazeldine, Leiahdorus, Oliver Riot, Scared of Chaka, and The Shins.

Talk radio has several outlets in the Albuquerque area. Including a public radio station run by The University of New Mexico KUNM-FM, for conservative talk radio there is KIVA "The Rock of Talk" owned by Eddy Aragon, and KKOB has a Cumulus Media station affiliated with ABC News Radio. As for sports radio there is KNML "The Sports Animal" and KQTM "The Team".

Food and agriculture
As a large and multicultural city, Albuquerque is home to a variety of global cuisines, in addition to local New Mexican cuisine. Many local restaurants receive statewide attention, with several becoming chains; the city hosts the headquarters of Blake's Lotaburger, Little Anita's, Twisters, Dion's, Boba Tea Company, and Sadie's, most of which offer New Mexican fare.

As the focus of the Middle Rio Grande Conservancy District, the city is punctuated by agricultural acequias that contrast with the otherwise heavily urban settings. Crops such as New Mexico chile are grown along the entire Rio Grande; the red or green chile pepper is a staple of New Mexican cuisine and widely available in restaurants, including national fast-food chains. Likewise, the Albuquerque metro is a major contributor to the Middle Rio Grande Valley AVA, where New Mexico wine is produced at several vineyards; the river also provides trade access to the Mesilla Valley to the south (containing Las Cruces, New Mexico and El Paso, Texas), with its own wine offerings, and the adjacent Hatch Valley, which is well known for its New Mexico chile peppers. Albuquerque also has a burgeoning brewery scene.

International Balloon Fiesta

The Albuquerque International Balloon Fiesta takes place at Balloon Fiesta Park the first week of October. Although the global COVID-19 forced the cancellation of the 2020 event, The Albuquerque International Balloon Fiesta successfully returned in 2021. It is one of Albuquerque's biggest attractions. Hundreds of hot-air balloons are seen every day, and there is live music, arts and crafts, and food.

Architecture

The original architecture of La Villa de Albuquerque is referred to as the Territorial Style, it was revitalized as the Territorial Revival architecture. Architect John Gaw Meem is often credited with this revival.

John Gaw Meem is also credited with developing and popularizing the Pueblo Revival style, which was based in Santa Fe but received an important Albuquerque commission in 1933 as the architect of the University of New Mexico. He retained this commission for the next quarter-century and developed the university's distinctive Southwest style.  Meem also designed the Cathedral Church of St. John in 1950.

Pueblo Deco architecture was derived from Pueblo and Territorial styles meeting the Art Deco movement, and it is richly featured in downtown Albuquerque. Albuquerque boasts a unique nighttime cityscape, personified in the lights of Albuquerque, a common motif in art and song. The city lights twinkle and glitter from views on Nine Mile Hill, it was among Elvis Presley's favorite views. Route 66 era neon signs, and LED style versions of the neon-style are common throughout the city. Many building exteriors are illuminated in vibrant colors such as green and blue. The Wells Fargo Building is illuminated green. The DoubleTree Hotel changes colors nightly, and the Compass Bank building is illuminated blue. The rotunda of the county courthouse is illuminated yellow, while the tops of the Bank of Albuquerque and the Bank of the West are illuminated reddish-yellow. Due to the nature of the soil in the Rio Grande Valley, the skyline is lower than might be expected in a city of comparable size elsewhere, and it was used to highlight the low-lying architecture of heritage Pueblo and Hispano architectural styles.

Albuquerque has expanded greatly in area since the mid-1940s. During those years of expansion, the planning of the newer areas has considered that people drive rather than walk. The pre-1940s parts of Albuquerque are quite different in style and scale from the post-1940s areas. The older areas include the North Valley, the South Valley, various neighborhoods near downtown, and Corrales. The newer areas generally feature four- to six-lane roads in a 1 mile (1.61 km) grid. Each 1 square mile (2.59 km) is divided into four  neighborhoods by smaller roads set 0.5 miles (0.8 km) between major roads. When driving along major roads in the newer sections of Albuquerque, one sees strip malls, signs, and cinderblock walls. The upside of this planning style is that neighborhoods are shielded from the worst of the noise and lights on the major roads. The downside is that it is virtually impossible to go anywhere without driving.

Libraries
The Albuquerque Bernalillo County Library system consists of nineteen libraries to serve the city, including the Main Library, Special Collections branch (Old Main Library), and Ernie Pyle branch, which is located in the former home of noted war correspondent Ernie Pyle. The Old Main Library was the first library of Albuquerque and from 1901 until 1948 it was the only public library. The original library was donated to the state by Joshua and Sarah Raynolds. After suffering some fire damage in 1923 the city decided it was time to construct a building for the library to be moved to, however, by 1970 even after additions were made the population and library needs had outgrown the building for its use as a main library and it was turned into Special Collections. The Old Main Library was recognized as a landmark in September 1979. 
It was not until 1974 with the movement of the South Valley Library into a new building that the Bernalillo built and administered a public library. Not long after, in 1986, the Bernalillo and Albuquerque government decided that joint powers would work best to serve the needs of the community and created the Albuquerque/Bernalillo County Library System.

Parks and recreation
The Bosque is a major outdoors area in the city, it has to numerous hiking and biking trails. The Sandia–Manzano Mountains and West Mesa also have many hiking trails, such as La Luz Trail and Petroglyph National Monument. According to the Trust for Public Land, Albuquerque has 291 public parks as of 2017, most of which are administered by the city Parks and Recreation Department. The total amount of parkland is 42.9 square miles (111 km2), or about 23% of the city's total area—one of the highest percentages among large cities in the U.S. About 82% of city residents live within walking distance of a park.

The Albuquerque Biological Park manages the ABQ BioPark Botanic Garden, ABQ BioPark Aquarium, Tingley Beach, and ABQ BioPark Zoo. Amusement parks in the city include Cliff's Amusement Park and Hinkle Family Fun Center; there was formerly The Beach waterpark, which became a vacant lot on Desert Surf Circle for several years, until Topgolf made a driving range in the lot.

There are numerous golf courses in the city area; Arroyo Del Oso Golf Course, Isleta Eagle Golf Course, Ladera Golf Course, Los Altos Golf Course, Paa-Ko Ridge Golf Club, Paradise Hills Golf Course, Puerto del Sol Golf Course, Sandia Golf Club, Santa Ana Golf Club, Twin Warriors Golf Club, and University of New Mexico's Championship Golf Course.

Traditional arts
Albuquerque is home to over 300 other visual arts, music, dance, literary, film, ethnic, and craft organizations, museums, festivals and associations, and the state's capital Santa Fe is known for being a major arts city. One of the major art events in the state is the summertime New Mexico Arts and Crafts Fair, a nonprofit show exclusively for New Mexico artists and held annually in Albuquerque since 1961.

Sports

The Albuquerque Isotopes are a minor league affiliate of the Colorado Rockies, having derived their name from The Simpsons season 12 episode "Hungry, Hungry Homer", which involves the Springfield Isotopes baseball team considering relocating to Albuquerque. 

On June 6, 2018, the USL Championship division announced its latest soccer expansion club with New Mexico United, who play their home matches at Rio Grande Credit Union Field at Isotopes Park

Having been home to boxing mainstays Brenda Burnside, Bob Foster, and Johnny Tapia, Albuquerque later became home to Jackson Wink MMA gym. Several MMA world champions and fighters, including Holly Holm and Jon Jones, train in that facility. The PGA of America offers Albuquerque golf tournaments with Sun Country Golf House, including the Sun Country PGA Championship and the New Mexico Open which have been hosted in the metropolitan area several times. Roller sports are finding a home in Albuquerque as they hosted USARS Championships in 2015, and are home to Roller hockey, and Roller Derby teams.

While no longer operating in an official capacity, the defunct Albuquerque Dukes minor league baseball team still has a major following, and the Major League Baseball organization is aware of the team's continued popularity. The Isotopes sometimes has Dukes Retro Night where they wear Dukes uniforms, and The Duke mascot continues to be an icon of the city.

Government and politics 

Albuquerque is a charter city, exercising home rule as opposed to being directly governed by state law. Its charter was adopted in 1917 and has been amended several times, most notably in 1974, when the municipal government was changed from a commission-manager system to its current mayor-council system. Under this arrangement, power is divided between a mayor who serves as chief executive, and a nine-member council that holds legislative authority. The current mayor is Tim Keller, who was elected in 2017.

The mayor of Albuquerque holds a full-time paid position and is directly elected for four-year terms.  Members of the Albuquerque City Council serve part-time, paid positions and are elected from their nine respective districts for four-year terms, with four or five councilors elected every two years. Elections for mayor and councilor are nonpartisan. Each December, a new council president and vice-president are chosen by and among council members. 

The city council has the power to adopt all ordinances, resolutions, or other legislation. It meets twice a month in the Vincent E. Griego Council Chambers of the Albuquerque/Bernalillo County Government Center. Ordinances and resolutions passed by the council are presented to the mayor for his approval; if the mayor vetoes an item, the council can override the veto by a two-thirds vote of councilors. Each year, the mayor submits a city budget proposal for the next year to the council by April 1, and the council acts on the proposal within the next 60 days.

Albuquerque's judicial system consists of the Bernalillo County Metropolitan Court, which serves other municipalities and unincorporated areas in the county; the main Metropolitan Courthouse is located in downtown Judges serve in nineteen divisions and are subject to partisan elections by county voters every four years.

The Albuquerque Police Department (APD) is the chief law enforcement entity within city limits; the unincorporated area of Bernalillo County is policed primarily by the Bernalillo County Sheriff's Department. With approximately 1,000 sworn officers, APD is the largest municipal police department in New Mexico; in September 2008, it was the 49th largest police department in the country, according to the U.S. Department of Justice.

Economy

Albuquerque is New Mexico's leading economic center, accounting for half the state's economic activity. The city's economy is highly diversified, centering on science, medicine, technology, commerce, education, media entertainment, and culture (particularly fine arts); construction, film production, and retail trade have seen the most robust growth since 2020. 

Albuquerque is the center of the New Mexico Technology Corridor, a concentration of institutions engaged in scientific research and development, which in turn forms part of the larger Rio Grande Technology Corridor that that stretches from southern Colorado to southwestern Texas. Major nodes within the corridor include federal installations such as Kirtland Air Force Base, Los Alamos National Laboratory, and Sandia National Laboratories; private healthcare facilities such as Lovelace Respiratory Research Institute and Presbyterian Health Services; academic institutions such as the University of New Mexico and Central New Mexico Community College; and private companies such as Intel (which has a fabrication site in neighboring Rio Rancho), Facebook (with a data center in Los Lunas), Northrop Grumman, passive solar energy company Zomeworks, and Tempur-Pedic. The city was also the founding location of MITS and Microsoft. 

Beginning with the Manhattan Project in the 1940s, federal labs such as Los Alamos, Sandia, and Lawrence Livermore National Laboratory have cooperated on multidisciplinary research in the region; contractors for these facilities bring highly educated workers and researchers to an otherwise relatively isolated area, many of whom establish or work with local tech companies. The federal government spends roughly $4 billion annually in research and development in and around Albuquerque. Pursuant to the CHIPS and Science Act—federal legislation aimed at expanding domestic semiconductor manufacturing, research and development of new technology, and workforce training—the U.S. Department of Energy announced plans to construct a new 100,000-square-foot technology incubator for companies, academia, and national laboratories, as well as a new platform for facilitating the development of tech startups among minority communities.  

The governments of Albuquerque and New Mexico have sought to attract more private investment into technology startups. The bioscience sector has experienced particularly robust growth, beginning with the 2013 opening of a BioScience Center in Uptown Albuquerque, which was the state’s first private incubator for biotechnology startups; since then, New Mexico-based scientists have formed roughly 150 bioscience startups, many of which are based in the Albuquerque metropolitan area. In 2017, the state-funded Bioscience Authority was established to help promote local industry development, particularly through public-private partnerships; the following year, pharmaceutical company Curia built two large facilities in Albuquerque, and in fall 2022 broke ground on a $100 million expansion of its local operations.  

Film studios have a major presence throughout New Mexico; Netflix maintains a major production hub at Albuquerque Studios. There are numerous shopping centers and malls within the city, including ABQ Uptown, Coronado, Cottonwood, Nob Hill, and Winrock. Outside city limits but surrounded by the city is a horse racing track and casino called The Downs Casino and Racetrack, and the pueblos surrounding the city feature resort casinos, including Sandia Resort, Santa Ana Star, Isleta Resort, and Laguna Pueblo's Route 66 Resort.  

Forbes magazine rated Albuquerque the best city in America for business and careers in 2006, and as the 13th best (out of 200 metro areas) in 2008. The city ranked seventh among America's Engineering Capitals in 2014 by Forbes. Albuquerque was named one of the "Top 10 Best Cities to Live" by U.S. News & World Report in 2009 and was recognized as the fourth best place to live for families by the TLC network. It was ranked among the Top Best Cities for Jobs in 2007 and among the Top 50 Best Places to Live and Play by National Geographic Adventure.

Education

Albuquerque is home to the University of New Mexico, the largest university in the state and the flagship of the state public university system. UNM includes a School of Medicine, which was ranked in the top 50 primary care-oriented medical schools in the country. Central New Mexico Community College is a county-funded junior college serving new high school graduates and adults returning to school.

Albuquerque hosts several programs and nonprofit schools of higher learning, including Southwest University of Visual Arts, Southwestern Indian Polytechnic Institute, Trinity Southwest University, the University of St. Francis College of Nursing and Allied Health Department of Physician Assistant Studies, and the St. Norbert College Master of Theological Studies program. The Ayurvedic Institute, one of the first Ayurveda colleges specializing in Ayurvedic medicine outside India, was established in 1984. Other state and nonprofit institutions of higher learning have moved some programs into Albuquerque; these include New Mexico State University, Highlands University, Lewis University, Wayland Baptist University, and Webster University. Several for-profit technical schools including Brookline College, Pima Medical Institute, National American University, Grand Canyon University, the University of Phoenix and several barber/beauty colleges have established their presence in the area.

Albuquerque Public Schools (APS), one of the largest school districts in the nation, provides educational services to almost 100,000 children across the city. Schools within APS include both public and charter entities. Numerous accredited private preparatory schools also serve Albuquerque students. These include various pre-high school religious (Christian, Jewish, Islamic) affiliates and Montessori schools, as well as Menaul School, Albuquerque Academy, St. Pius X High School, Sandia Preparatory School, the Bosque School, Evangel Christian Academy, Hope Christian School, Hope Connection School, Shepherd Lutheran School, Temple Baptist Academy, and Victory Christian. Accredited private schools serving students with special education needs in Albuquerque include: Desert Hills, Pathways Academy, and Presbyterian Ear Institute Oral School. The New Mexico School for the Deaf runs a preschool for children with hearing impairments in Albuquerque.

Infrastructure
Since the city's founding, it has continued to be included on travel and trade routes including the historic El Camino Real, Santa Fe Railway (ATSF), Route 66, and the modern Interstate 25, Interstate 40, and Albuquerque International Sunport.

Transportation

Main highways
Some of the main highways in the metro area include:

 Pan-American Freeway: More commonly known as Interstate 25 or "I-25", it is the main north–south highway on the city's eastern side of the Rio Grande. It is also the main north–south highway in the state (by connecting Albuquerque with Santa Fe and Las Cruces) and a plausible route of the eponymous Pan American Highway. Since Route 66 was decommissioned in the 1980s, the only remaining US highway in Albuquerque, unsigned US-85, shares its alignment with I-25. US-550 splits off to the northwest from I-25/US-85 in Bernalillo.
 Coronado Freeway: More commonly known as Interstate 40 or "I-40", it is the city's main east–west traffic artery and an important transcontinental route. The freeway's name in the city is in reference to 16th century conquistador and explorer Francisco Vásquez de Coronado.
 Paseo del Norte: (aka; New Mexico State Highway 423): This 6-lane controlled-access highway is approximately five miles north of Interstate 40. It runs as a surface road with at-grade intersections from Tramway Blvd (at the base of the Sandia Mountains) to Interstate 25, after which it continues as a controlled-access freeway through Los Ranchos de Albuquerque, over the Rio Grande to North Coors Boulevard. Paseo Del Norte then continues west as a surface road through the Petroglyph National Monument until it reaches Atrisco Vista Blvd and the Double Eagle II Airport. The interchange with Interstate 25 was reconstructed in 2014 to improve traffic flow.
 Coors Boulevard: Coors is the main north–south artery to the west of the Rio Grande in Albuquerque. There is one full interchange where it connects with Interstate 40; The rest of the route connects to other roads with at-grade intersections controlled by stoplights. The Interstate 25 underpass has no access to Coors. Parts of the highway have sidewalks, bike lanes, and medians, but most sections have only dirt shoulders and a center turn lane. To the north of Interstate 40, part of the route is numbered as State Highway 448, while to the south, part of the route is numbered as State Highway 45.
 Rio Bravo Boulevard: The main river crossing between Westside Albuquerque and the Sunport, Rio Bravo is a four-lane divided highway that runs from University Boulevard in the east, through the South Valley, to Coors Boulevard in the west where it is contiguous with Dennis Chaves Blvd. It follows NM-500 for its entire route.
 Central Avenue: Central is one of the historical routings of Route 66, it is no longer a main through highway, its usefulness having been supplanted by Interstate 40.
 Alameda Boulevard: The main road between Rio Rancho and North Albuquerque, Alameda Blvd. stretches from Tramway Rd. to Coors. Blvd. The route is designated as the eastern portion of NM-528.
 Tramway Boulevard: Serves as a bypass around the northeastern quadrant, the route is designated as NM-556. Tramway Boulevard starts at I-25 near Sandia Pueblo, and heads east as a two-lane road. It turns south near the base of the Sandia Peak Tramway and becomes an expressway-type divided highway until its terminus near I-40 and Central Avenue by the western entrance to Tijeras Canyon.

The interchange between I-40 and I-25 is known as the "Big I". Originally built in 1966, it was rebuilt in 2002. The Big I is the only five-level stack interchange in the state of New Mexico.

Bridges
There are six road bridges that cross the Rio Grande and serve the municipality on at least one end if not both. The eastern approaches of the northernmost three all pass through adjacent unincorporated areas, the Village of Los Ranchos de Albuquerque, or the North Valley. In downstream order they are:
 Alameda Bridge
 Paseo del Norte Bridge
 Montaño Bridge
  I-40 Bridge
 Central at Old Town Bridge
 Barelas Bridge

Two more bridges serve urbanized areas contiguous to the city's perforated southern boundary.
 Rio Bravo Bridge (NM-500)
 I-25 Bridge (near Isleta Pueblo)

Rail

The state owns most of the city's rail infrastructure which is used by a commuter rail system, long-distance passenger trains, and the freight trains of the BNSF Railway.

Freight service
BNSF Railway operates a small yard operation out of Abajo yard, located just south of the César E. Chávez Ave. overpass and the New Mexico Rail Runner Express yards. Most freight traffic through the Central New Mexico region is processed via a much larger hub in nearby Belen, New Mexico.

Intercity rail
Amtrak's Southwest Chief, which travels between Chicago and Los Angeles, serves the Albuquerque area daily with one stop in each direction at the Alvarado Transportation Center in downtown.

Commuter rail
The New Mexico Rail Runner Express, a commuter rail line, began service between Sandoval County and Albuquerque in July 2006 using an existing BNSF right-of-way which was purchased by New Mexico in 2005. Service expanded to Valencia County in December 2006 and to Santa Fe on December 17, 2008. Rail Runner now connects Santa Fe, Sandoval, Bernalillo, and Valencia Counties with thirteen station stops, including three stops within Albuquerque.
The trains connect Albuquerque to downtown Santa Fe with eight roundtrips per weekday. The section of the line running south to Belen is served less frequently.

Local mass transit 

The primary mass transit system is ABQ RIDE, which operates a variety of bus routes throughout the city, including the Rapid Ride express bus service. The central nexus for public transportation is the Alvarado Transportation System, which connects ABQ RIDE to Amtrak, Greyhound Lines, and the New Mexico Rail Runner Express commuter rail.

In 2011, the City of Albuquerque commissioned a study to develop a bus rapid transit system through the Central Avenue corridor, which accounted for 44% of all bus riders in ABQ RIDE. Construction began in 2017 on Albuquerque Rapid Transit (ART), including dedicated bus lanes between Coors and Louisiana Boulevards. ART opened for service in November 2019 and was free to use until January 1, 2020.

Albuquerque was one of two cities in New Mexico to have had an electric street railway; its horse-drawn streetcar lines were electrified in the early 20th century. The Albuquerque Traction Company failed financially in 1915 and the City Electric Company was formed in its place. Despite traffic booms during the First World War, and unaided by lawsuits attempting to force the streetcar company to pay for paving, that system also failed later in 1927, leaving the streetcar's "motorettes" unemployed.

In 2006, under Mayor Martin Chavez, Albuquerque planned a "fast track" development of a "Modern Streetcar" project, which wound run mostly in the southeast quadrant on Central Avenue and Yale Boulevard. Funding for the $270 million system failed amid vocal opposition from some residents.

Bicycle transit 
Albuquerque has a well-developed network of trails, bicycle routes, and paths totaling over 400 miles. A 2021 study by Walk Score ranked it 26th out of 130 U.S. cities in bike friendliness, based on indicators such infrastructure, terrain, and connectivity. In 2009, Albuquerque was identified by Good Worldwide as having one of the "best burgeoning bike scenes" in North Americ, including the world's largest covered BMX track, Duke City BMX. The same year, Albuquerque opened its first Bicycle Boulevard on Silver Avenue. In 2015, the city adopted the "Bikeway & Trails Facility Plan" to invest in its bicycle infrastructure, including improving and expanding the existing system, adding new routes, and establishing bike sharing programs.

Walkability 

A 2011 study by Walk Score ranked Albuquerque as the 28th most walkable of the fifty largest U.S. cities, indicating below average performance in metrics such as access to public transit and proximity to people or amenities. A follow up study a decade later ranked the city 73rd out of 130 cities nationwide, with a walkability score of 42.6 compared to an average of 48, classifying it as "car-dependent".

Airports 

It is the largest airport in New Mexico, and the state's sole international airport, serving over 5 million passengers annually. The city owns and operates the much smaller Double Eagle II Airport, which is primarily used for air ambulances, corporate flights, military flights, charter flights, aviation training, and private flights.

Utilities

Energy
PNM Resources, New Mexico's largest electricity provider, is based in Albuquerque. They serve about 487,000 electricity customers statewide. In September 2021, PNM entered final merger talks with Avangrid, the U.S. subsidiary of Spanish power giant Iberdrola. New Mexico Gas Company provides natural gas services to more than 500,000 customers in the state, including the Albuquerque metro area.

Sanitation
The Albuquerque Bernalillo County Water Utility Authority is responsible for the delivery of drinking water and the treatment of wastewater. Trash and recycling in the city are managed by the City of Albuquerque Solid Waste Management Department.

South Side Water Reclamation Plant.

Healthcare
Albuquerque is the medical hub of New Mexico, hosting numerous medical centers. The University of New Mexico Hospital is the largest hospital in New Mexico with 628 licensed beds and is the primary teaching hospital for the University of New Mexico School of Medicine, the state's only medical school. It provides the state's only residency training programs, children's hospital, burn center, and level I pediatric and adult trauma centers, as well as a certified advanced primary stroke center and the largest collection of adult and pediatric specialty and subspecialty programs in the state. Albuquerque's other largest hospitals are Presbyterian Hospital (Presbyterian Healthcare Services) with 543 licensed beds, Raymond G. Murphy VA Medical Center (Veterans Health Administration) with 298 beds, and Lovelace Medical Center (Lovelace Health System) with 263 beds. Smaller specialty hospitals include the Heart Hospital of New Mexico and Lovelace Women's Hospital.

Notable people

Sister cities

Alburquerque, Spain
Ashgabat, Turkmenistan
Chihuahua, Mexico
Guadalajara, Mexico
Helmstedt, Germany
Hualien, Taiwan
Lanzhou, China
Lusaka, Zambia
Rehovot, Israel
Sasebo, Japan

See also

 List of municipalities in New Mexico
 National Old Trails Road
 Breaking Bad and Better Call Saul, TV shows set in Albuquerque

Explanatory notes

References

Further reading

 Ciotola, Nicholas P. "Italian immigrants in Albuquerque, 1880 to 1930: A study in Western distinctiveness." Journal of the West 43.4 (2004): 41–48.
 Luckingham, Bradford. The urban southwest: a profile history of Albuquerque, El Paso, Phoenix, Tucson (Texas Western Press, 1982)
 Simmons, Marc. Albuquerque: a narrative history (University of New Mexico Press, 1982)

External links

 
 1905 Magazine Article with historical photos
 
 

 
Cities in New Mexico
Cities in Bernalillo County, New Mexico
Albuquerque metropolitan area
County seats in New Mexico
Populated places established in 1706
Spanish-American culture in New Mexico
1706 establishments in New Spain
Railway towns in New Mexico
New Mexico populated places on the Rio Grande